Daniel Schorn (born 21 October 1988) is an Austrian former professional road bicycle racer, who rode professionally between 2008 and 2016 for the , , and  teams.

Major results

2004
 1st  Road race, National Novice Road Championships
2005
 1st Stage 3 Niedersachsen Rundfahrt (junior)
2007
 3rd GP Austria Alu Guss
 8th Overall Mainfranken-Tour
2008
 1st Stage 1 ARBÖ-Raiba ÖBV Radsporttage
 3rd Time trial, National Under-23 Road Championships
 5th Road race, UEC European Under-23 Road Championships
2009
 1st Stage 2b Linz–Passau–Budweis
 2nd Eschborn–Frankfurt City Loop U23
 2nd Lavanttaler Radsporttage
 3rd Overall Tchibo Cup
3rd Schwaz
 4th Internationales Eröffnungsrennen
 6th GP Judendorf-Strassengel
2010
 1st Stage 3 Tour de Normandie
 6th Neuseen Classics
 10th Overall Okolo Slovenska
1st Stages 2 & 6
2011
 3rd Tour de Rijke
 7th Trofeo Cala Millor
 10th Memorial Rik Van Steenbergen
2012
 1st Stage 2b (TTT) Settimana Internazionale di Coppi e Bartali
 3rd Volta Limburg Classic
 8th Eschborn–Frankfurt City Loop
 9th Clásica de Almería
2014
 2nd Omloop van het Houtland
 5th Druivenkoers Overijse
2015
 3rd Road race, National Road Championships
 8th Druivenkoers Overijse
2016
 1st Stage 1 Rhône-Alpes Isère Tour
 4th Overall Tour d'Azerbaïdjan
1st  Points classification
 6th GP Adria Mobil

References

External links
Team NetApp profile

Austrian male cyclists
1988 births
Living people
People from Zell am See
Cyclists at the 2012 Summer Olympics
Olympic cyclists of Austria
Sportspeople from Salzburg (state)